Ceer Motors is the first electric vehicle brand in the Kingdom of Saudi Arabia. The company will design, manufacture, and sell a range of electric cars including sedans and sports utility vehicles (SUVs) for the GCC region. Ceer Motors' distribution plan will focus on Middle Eastern markets  The brand name Ceer, translates to the Arabic word for "drive forward"  Ceer Motors vehicles are scheduled to be available in 2025.

Creation

Ceer Motors is a partnership between the Saudi sovereign wealth fund PIF (Public Investment Fund) and the Taiwanese contract manufacturer Foxconn. Saudi Arabia’s sovereign-wealth fund is projected to partner with the biggest assembler of Apple Inc. iPhones to build a $9 billion facility that manufactures microchips, electric-vehicle components and other electronics. The joint venture is part of an effort to create an industrial sector that Crown Prince Mohammed bin Salman expects to help accelerate efforts of diversifying the Kingdom's economy apart from being oil-dependant.

The company will license component technology from BMW to use in the electric vehicle development process. Foxconn, formally known as Hon Hai Precision Co., will develop the electrical architecture of the products, resulting in a portfolio of vehicles that will lead in connectivity and autonomous driving technologies.

Saudi 2030 Vision

The launch is in line with the Saudi Public Investment Fund’s strategy that focuses on diversifying KSA’s economy in line with the Saudi Vision 2030.

Investments

Ceer Motors is projected to contribute directly with over $150 million of foreign investment to the Kingdom and offer up to 30,000 direct and indirect job opportunities. This comes as part of PIF’s strategy to expand Saudi Arabia’s GDP growth by investing in local growth industries. By 2034, Ceer Motors is expected to contribute $8 billion to Saudi Arabia’s GDP

References 

Companies of Saudi Arabia
Saudi Arabian brands
Public Investment Fund
Car brands